Alan Shackleton (3 February 1934 – 26 April 2009) was an English footballer. He played for Burnley, Leeds United, Everton and Oldham Athletic. Despite good early scoring form at Leeds and Everton, he left for non-league football in the early 1960s.

References

External links
Profile at leeds-fans.org.uk

2009 deaths
1934 births
People from Padiham
English footballers
Burnley F.C. players
Leeds United F.C. players
Everton F.C. players
Nelson F.C. players
Oldham Athletic A.F.C. players
Tonbridge Angels F.C. players
Association football forwards